Bobby Bryant (May 19, 1934 – June 10, 1998) was an American jazz trumpeter and flugelhornist.

Biography
Bryant was born in Hattiesburg, Mississippi, and played saxophone in his youth. He moved to Chicago in 1952, where he studied at the Cosmopolitan School of Music until 1957. Remaining in the city until 1960, he played with Red Saunders, Billy Williams, and other ensembles. He relocated to New York City in 1960 and then Los Angeles in 1961, where he became a fixture on the West Coast jazz scene. He led his own groups in addition to playing with Vic Damone, Charles Mingus, Oliver Nelson, Gerald Wilson, Frank Capp/Nat Pierce, and the Clayton-Hamilton Jazz Orchestra. He also worked as a studio musician and a music educator.

Perhaps his most famous solo was in the song "L.O.V.E" recorded with Nat King Cole in 1964.

Bryant had sustained health problems in the 1990s which reduced his activity to part-time.  He died in Los Angeles of a heart attack at the age of 64.

Discography

As leader
Big Band Blues (Vee-Jay, 1961 [1974])
Ain't Doing Too B-A-D, Bad (Cadet, 1967)
Earth Dance (Pacific Jazz, 1969)
The Jazz Excursion into "Hair" (Pacific Jazz, 1969)
Swahili Strut (Cadet, 1971)

As arranger
With Gene Ammons
Free Again (Prestige, 1971)
With Peggy Lee
A Natural Woman (Capitol, 1969)

As sideman
With Brass Fever
Time Is Running Out (Impulse!, 1976) 
With Earth, Wind & Fire
I Am (Columbia, 1979)
With Clare Fischer
Manteca! (Pacific Jazz, 1965)
With Benny Golson
Killer Joe (Columbia, 1977)
With Eddie Harris
How Can You Live Like That? (Atlantic, 1976)
With Richard "Groove" Holmes
 Six Million Dollar Man,  (RCA/Flying Dutchman, 1975)
With Quincy Jones
 Roots (A&M, 1977)
With Stan Kenton
Kenton / Wagner (Capitol, 1964)
With B. B. King
L.A. Midnight (ABC, 1972)
With Blue Mitchell
Bantu Village (Blue Note, 1969)
With Oliver Nelson
Sound Pieces (Impulse!, 1966)
Live from Los Angeles (Impulse!, 1967)
Soulful Brass with Steve Allen (Impulse!, 1968)
Black, Brown and Beautiful (Flying Dutchman, 1969)
Skull Session (Flying Dutchman, 1975)
Stolen Moments (East Wind, 1975)
With Lalo Schifrin
More Mission: Impossible (Paramount, 1968)
Mannix (Paramount, 1968)
Gypsies (Tabu, 1978) 
With Horace Silver
Silver 'n Brass (Blue Note, 1975)
With The Three Sounds
Coldwater Flat (Blue Note, 1968)
With Gerald Wilson 
On Stage (Pacific Jazz, 1965) 
Feelin' Kinda Blues (Pacific Jazz, 1965) 
Everywhere (Pacific Jazz, 1968)
California Soul (Pacific Jazz, 1968)
With Jimmy Witherspoon
Baby, Baby, Baby (Prestige, 1963)

References

1934 births
1998 deaths
Musicians from Hattiesburg, Mississippi
American jazz trumpeters
American male trumpeters
20th-century American musicians
20th-century trumpeters
Jazz musicians from Mississippi
20th-century American male musicians
American male jazz musicians
Clayton-Hamilton Jazz Orchestra members